Virginie Arnold (born 24 December 1979 in Biscarrosse, Landes) is a archer from France. She was a bronze medalist in the women's team event at the 2008 Summer Olympics.

At the 2008 Summer Olympics in Beijing Arnold finished her ranking round with a total of 626 points. This gave her the 39th seed for the final competition bracket in which she faced Khatuna Lorig in the first round. Lorig won the confrontation between the 39th and 26th seed with 107-105 and Arnold was eliminated.

Together with Bérengère Schuh and Sophie Dodemont she also took part in the team event. With her 626 score from the ranking round combined with the 645 of Schuh and the 632 of Dodemont the French team was in fifth position after the ranking round, which gave them a straight seed into the quarter finals. With 218-211 they were too strong for the Polish team. In the semi final against South Korea they scored only 184 points with the Koreans scoring 213, missing out on the final. They recovered in the bronze medal match and won against Great Britain 203-201 to claim the bronze.

References

External links
 

1979 births
Living people
French female archers
Olympic archers of France
Archers at the 2008 Summer Olympics
Olympic bronze medalists for France
Olympic medalists in archery
Medalists at the 2008 Summer Olympics
Sportspeople from Landes (department)